Nord's 22nd constituency was a French legislative constituency in the Nord département. It was abolished in the 2010 redistricting of French legislative constituencies. The last MP was Christian Bataille.

References 

Defunct French legislative constituencies
French legislative constituencies of Nord